Irish Molly-o is a traditional Irish song of Irish and Scottish origin. Widely popular in North America in the early 19th century, it was first published by A.W. Aunner in Philadelphia around 1830 and later in New York City by Kennedy.  Both "The Hat My Father Wore" and "The Sash My Father Wore" were adapted from this song.

Lyrics

Other songs with the same title 

The other Irish Molly-o, a different song entirely, was recorded by the Flanagan Brothers in the 1920s and by Maura O'Connell and others in the 1980s.  It was written by the Tin Pan Alley duo of William Jerome and Jean Schwartz in 1890.

References 

Scottish folk songs